The BR Standard Class 8 was a class of a single 4-6-2 Pacific steam locomotive designed by Robert Riddles for use by British Railways. Only the prototype was constructed, named Duke of Gloucester. Constructed at Crewe Works in 1954, the Duke, as it is popularly known, was a replacement for the destroyed LMS Princess Royal Class locomotive number 46202 Princess Anne, which was involved in the Harrow and Wealdstone rail crash of 1952.

The Duke was based on the BR Standard Class 7 Britannia design. It incorporated three sets of modified Caprotti valve gear, relatively new to British locomotive engineering and more efficient than Walschaerts or Stephenson valve gear. The Duke was regarded as a failure by locomotive crews due to its poor steaming characteristics and its heavy fuel consumption. Trials undertaken by British Railways also returned negative feedback, reporting problems with the poor draughting of the locomotive which resulted in difficulty adhering to the timetables.

The result was an operational period of only eight years. This unique locomotive was saved from being scrapped at Woodham Brothers scrapyard in Barry, Vale of Glamorgan, South Wales when it was purchased by a group of railway enthusiasts who restored it from scrapyard to as-built condition in 13 years. Since then, modifications have been made to the original design, resulting in one of the most efficient and powerful steam locomotives ever to run in Britain. As a result, the Duke of Gloucester can frequently be seen on the mainline around Britain.

Background 

Riddles had frequently argued the case for the inclusion of a Standard Class 8 Pacific into the standard range of locomotives being introduced by British Railways. However, these proposals were rejected by the Railway Executive on the grounds of cost in attempting to develop a form of steam motive power that was not necessarily required for use on Britain's railways, as there were enough Standard Class 7 Britannia locomotives already available for use. However, opportunity came out of adversity when the short-lived rebuild of the LMS Turbomotive, 46202 Princess Anne, was destroyed in the Harrow and Wealdstone rail disaster of 1952. A gap now existed in the roster for locomotives with 8P power classification, of which the demand was high for the efficient operation of heavy expresses on the West Coast Main Line between London Euston and Scotland.  This presented Riddles with the perfect opportunity to press the case for his new design, a prototype of which was duly authorised for construction.

Design details 

At first, Riddles wished to develop an enlarged version of his Standard Class 7 Britannias, as the design still featured a two-cylinder layout. However, the size of the cylinders in order to achieve the 8P power classification would have put the design over the British loading gauge limit and so a reluctant reversion to the three-cylinder layout ensued. This reluctance was born from experience with the Gresley Pacifics, whose conjugated valve gear was difficult to maintain due to the location of the middle cylinder between the frames. Therefore, an alternative type of valve gear had to be found.

The valve gear that was settled upon was a rotary cam-driven form of Caprotti valve gear, developed by Heenan & Froude with poppet valves. This was based on Italian locomotive practice and allowed precise control of steam admission to the cylinders while improving exhaust flow and boiler draughting characteristics when compared to the more conventional Walschaerts and Stephenson valve gear. On paper this created a free-steaming, hard-working locomotive capable of hauling heavy loads over long distances but, in practice, fundamental design errors and undetected deviations from the drawings made during construction combined to prevent the locomotive from achieving its expected performance during British Railways ownership.

The main problem was known even when the locomotive was under construction, as Mr. L.T. Daniels, the representative of the British Caprotti company, recommended the use of the Kylchap blastpipe, which could have coped with the fierce exhaust blasts experienced with the Caprotti system. A standard double chimney of the Swindon type had already been fabricated in order to cut costs and it had been installed in the smokebox supposedly before Riddles could do anything about it.  As a result, the locomotive suffered due to the choke area of both chimney and blastpipe being much too small for the pressure created by the exhaust, leading to poor draughting. Further problems regarding the firebox of the locomotive were only discovered during restoration, including a poorly dimensioned ashpan and dampers that were again too small, strangling the fire of air when operating at speed. Further, British Railways "Modernisation Plan" was already under development concurrent with the construction of 71000 raising other questions.

Following experience of occasional cracks appearing near the spring brackets of the Britannias and Clans, a substantial rearrangement took place in this area that resulted in the locomotive riding on three cast steel "sub-frames" carrying the ten front-most spring brackets and lengthened spring brackets behind the rear driven axle. Perhaps remarkably, these were not integrated into a cast combined sub-frame/pony truck pivot stretcher, the pony truck pivot stretcher being a fabrication. Had the planned batch of further smaller Pacifics been built, they would have been fitted with this arrangement.

Construction history

The opportunity to create an entire batch of locomotives within the 8P category was declined by the Railway Executive. It had been said this was because the design process had been highly expensive and complex, so that when the locomotive emerged from Crewe Works in 1954, such thoughts were inappropriate, especially with the advent of the 1955 Modernisation Plan. As a result, 71000 remained the solitary member of a proposed class of Standard 8P locomotives.

Naming the locomotive

Upon emerging from Crewe Works in 1954, the locomotive was named Duke of Gloucester prior to entering revenue-earning service. Had further locomotives been constructed, they would have belonged to the Duke Class, standing alongside the sister locomotives of the Britannia and  Clan Classes. Since then, the locomotive has colloquially been referred to by steam enthusiasts and crews as the Duke.

Operational details 

The Duke was highly unpopular with crews, who regarded it as something of a liability due to its poor steam production. Inefficiencies caused by the problems regarding the draughting abilities and firebox design meant that no further examples were constructed.  The fact that no effort was made to rectify these problems indicates the change in policy regarding steam locomotives, with the Modernisation Plan entering circulation as the "Duke" entered service. Based for its entire working life at Crewe North depot, the locomotive was utilised in hauling boat trains on the undemanding North Wales Coast Line between Crewe and Holyhead. All of this culminated in the locomotive having a short service life of only eight years, being withdrawn from service in 1962. The reputation of the locomotive amongst its crews as being a poor steamer was eventually to disappear – but only after it was rescued from the scrapyard during 1974.

Livery and numbering

The livery of the "Duke" was a continuation of the British Railways standard class practice. The class was given the power classification 8P. Following on from the 'Britannias', the "Duke" was numbered under the British Railways standard numbering system in the 71xxx series. The "Duke" was given the number 71000, and featured brass nameplates with a black background, located on the smoke deflectors.

Preservation 

After withdrawal, the "Duke" was initially selected for the National Collection, though it was later decided that only the cylinder arrangement was of interest. One of the outside cylinders was removed for display at the Science Museum; the other was removed to restore balance in readiness for scrapping. The locomotive was purchased by Dai Woodham, though it was initially sent to the wrong scrapyard. After retrieval, the "Duke" languished for many years in Woodham Brothers scrapyard at Barry Island, South Wales, before enthusiasts purchased the locomotive in 1974, forming the Duke of Gloucester Steam Locomotive Trust.  Restoration began in earnest, though with many components missing, the most expensive of which being the Caprotti valve gear, it took 13 years of effort on the part of enthusiasts, with assistance in the guise of sponsorships from industry, to return the locomotive to near as-built condition. One of the very few compromises made was replacing the previous steel cylinders with spheroidal graphite iron.

Two significant construction errors were discovered during restoration:

 The chimney was too small compared with other locomotives of similar size, resulting in poor boiler draughting at times of high steam demand.
 The firebed (grate) air inlet dampers had not been built to the drawings; they were too small, resulting in poor air supply and inefficient combustion.

These errors were corrected and the opportunity taken to incorporate some other improvements, including the previously recommended Kylchap exhaust system, which has finally unlocked the locomotive's true potential as a powerful express passenger locomotive.  When the "Duke" was first allowed to haul a full load on the main line, it became immediately obvious that the boiler was now producing steam at a more efficient rate and that the reborn "Duke" was unrecognisable from the failure that was experienced under British Railways ownership.  With these modifications, the "Duke" is now one of the most powerful steam locomotives ever to run on Britain's railways, past or present (the LMS Coronation Class Pacifics held that title under British Railways auspices - the three cylinder "Duke" never actually achieved the 3000 cylinder horse power figure that was recorded by the four cylinder Princess Coronation Class); ironically, it is now more powerful than not only the English Electric Type 4 diesel locomotives which replaced it directly in service, but also the type 4 and 5 diesel locomotives built to replace the earlier diesels.

In the 1995 "Shap trials" (30 Sept to 3 October) 71000 broke the record for the fastest northbound ascent and achieved the highest EDHP figures during the event, its average over the Shap ascent was 2300 and peak 2803. The Duchess of Hamilton (46229) generated EDHP figures of 2150 and 2343 respectively. The A4 Sir Nigel Gresley (60007) suffered from poor coal and possible leaking tubes so only made EDHP figures of 1671 (average) and 1812 (peak).

The engine was then withdrawn for repairs before a return to service in January 2008. As the locomotive now bears little mechanical resemblance to that which operated under British Railways, it has also been used as a test bed, incorporating several other modifications and innovations. These are intended to investigate how much further the locomotive's performance can be enhanced, therefore raising speculation surrounding the capabilities of an entire batch of Standard class 8 "Pacifics" had history been different.

Models
On 17 December 2012 Hornby announced that in their 2013 product range they would make 71000 Duke of Gloucester in BR Brunswick Green. This model was released in late 2013, where it received mixed reviews. 

A ready to run model in O scale, produced by Ace Trains, was released in Summer 2019. Built to coarse scale standards, these apply mainly to the wheels rather than the model more generally. Uniquely, the model has a representation of working Caprotti valve gear 

The only well documented construction of working live steam scale Duke of Gloucester models in Model Engineer magazine was by Denis Evans of Blackpool in England.  Beginning in the 1966, and using original British Railways and Associated Locomotive Equipment (a subsidiary of Heenan & Froude) drawings, Denis built three Dukes each complete with fully working Caprotti valve gear, first in 7¼ inch gauge, and then 5 and 3½ inch gauges.  The 7¼ inch gauge Duke won awards at the 48th Model Engineer Exhibition in 1979, as did his 3½ inch gauge locomotive at the 61st Model Engineer Exhibition in 1992.

Footnotes

References 

 'British Railways standard 3 cylinder 4-6-2 express passenger steam locomotive No. 71000' (HMSO, British Transport Commission: London, 1957), p. [58] (Performance and efficiency tests, Bulletin No. 15)
'British Railways standard class "8" locomotives' (Engineer: 1954, 197, 81)
 'B.R. class 8 4-6-2 locomotive No. 71000' (Locomotive, Railway Carriage & Wagon Review: 1954, 60)
 'British Railways prototype class '8" express passenger locomotive' (Railway Magazine: 1954, 100)
 Clarke, David: Riddles Class 6/7 Standard Pacifics (Locomotives in Detail volume 5) (Ian Allan: Hinckley, 2006) 
 Herring, Peter: Classic British Steam Locomotives (Abbeydale Press: London, 2000) Section "BR Standard Class 8" 
 Hopkins, Danny and Streeter, Tony: 'The Duke's Bad Day' (Steam Railway Magazine: 2007, 338)
 Langston, Keith: Made in Crewe: 150 Years of Engineering Excellence (Mortons Media: Horncastle, 2006), 
 Nock, O.S.: 'Performance and efficiency tests on B.R. class 8 locomotive' (Engineer: 1957, 204)

Further reading

 Gilbert, Dr. P. T. (Ed.): A Detailed History Of BR Standard Steam Locomotives. Volume 1. Background to Standardisation and Pacific Classes (Railway Correspondence & Travel Society (RCTS): 1994)

External links 

 The BR Class 8 Steam Locomotive Trust website - latest news and photos of 71000 Duke of Gloucester
 The Duke of Gloucester website - more detail and pictures
 Steam Special along the West Cumbria Coast 24 February and 10 March 2007

8
4-6-2 locomotives
8 71000
Individual locomotives of Great Britain
Locomotives saved from Woodham Brothers scrapyard
Railway locomotives introduced in 1954
Unique locomotives
Standard gauge steam locomotives of Great Britain
2′C1′ h3 locomotives